Vernon Dumas (born 27 May 1978) is a Dominican cricketer. He played in eight first-class and four List A matches for the Windward Islands from 1997 to 2000.

See also
 List of Windward Islands first-class cricketers

References

External links
 

1978 births
Living people
Dominica cricketers
Windward Islands cricketers